The 2017 Rallye Deutschland was the tenth round of the 2017 World Rally Championship and was the 35th running of the Rallye Deutschland. The rally was won by Ott Tänak and Martin Järveoja, their second win in the World Rally Championship.

Eric Camilli and Benjamin Veillas won the WRC-2 category, their first success in the series. Pontus Tidemand and Jonas Andersson finished third which was enough to secure the title, as well as the constructors' title for Škoda Motorsport, in WRC-2.

Entry list

Classification

Event standings

Special stages

Power Stage
The Power Stage was a  stage at the end of the rally.

Championship standings after the rally

Drivers' Championship standings

Manufacturers' Championship standings

References

External links
 The official website of the World Rally Championship

2017 World Rally Championship season
2017
2017 in German motorsport
August 2017 sports events in Germany